Belmont Mansion may refer to:

 Belmont Mansion (Philadelphia), a historic house museum
 Belmont Mansion (Tennessee), listed on the National Register of Historic Places